Haridas is a 2013 Tamil-language action drama film written and directed by G. N. R. Kumaravelan starring Kishore and Sneha in the lead roles. Musical score is by Vijay Antony. It was released on 22 February 2013 to extremely positive reviews and was moderately successful at the box office. The movie was screened at 11th Chennai International Film Festival where it won 2 awards. It is unofficially remade in Bengali as Force in 2014.

Plot
Sivadas (Kishore) is the daring cop who gets ruthless against the local goon Aadhi (Pradeep Rawat) and is just miles away from nabbing the crook. He has a driver named Kandasamy (Soori). However, he is forced to leave the force for a while to take care of his autistic son, Haridas (Prithviraj Das) because of an unfortunate matter. With much difficulty, he enrolls Haridas in a normal school where Amudhavalli (Sneha) is a teacher specialized to deal with special children.

Kishore dwells into the character of Sivadas, a sorry father for not sparing time to his family when it mattered most and tries to understand his son's problem step by step. He understands the fact that autism is not a disease to brood over, it just needs the extra affection and cares rather than feeling sympathetic. Over a period of time the bonding between the teacher and the student blossoms like a bright sunflower. Does the father succeed in lodging a room in his son's imagination? What happens forms the rest of the film.

Cast
 Kishore as Sivadas
 Sneha as Amudhavalli
 Prithviraj Das as Haridas
 Soori as Kandasamy
 Pradeep Rawat as Aadhi
 Yugi Sethu as Ravi
 Varadharajalu as Varadharajan
 Sathyajith as the commissioner
 Raj Kapoor as P. T. Coach
  P V Chandramoulli  as Mouli
 O. A. K. Sundar as Selection committee member

Production

Casting
It was announced in 2012 that Kishore, the villain actor of Aadukalam and Polladhavan fame will play the male lead and Sneha would play the female lead. It was later speculated that Sneha might quit as she was about to get married on 11 May 2012 but, the shooting started from 10 March 2012 and Sneha was confirmed for the role. It is also reported that Sneha had quit Kochadaiyaan for Haridas, on asking the same to the director, he said that Sneha was extremely excited upon hearing the script and accepted the role immediately. She had reportedly said that out of the 80 odd scripts she had heard, none had excited her more. The crucial role of the boy was given to 'Prithviraj Das'.

Director Kumaravelan about his film: "The movie is about an eight-year-old boy's view on life and his father. For each and every child, his/her father is the first hero. This is the basic knot of the script. A different treatment has been given to the screenplay."

Filming
Filming started from 10 March 2012 in Chennai, and Kumaravelan revealed on 12 March 2012 that he is going to croon a song and the movie contains only three songs. The unit of Haridas had a narrow escape as their boat capsized in the high seas of Dhanushkodi, during a shoot on 27 June 2012. After shooting in the sea, one of the boats that they were traveling capsized due to the high tide around the area. Kumarvelan said, "I was filming a song sequence on the lead pair when there was a sudden rise in tide. A killer tide hit our boat and it capsized. We immediately sent Sneha safely to the shores in another lifeboat. My cameraman R. Rathnavelu started swimming, but I don't know how to swim. So, I was forced to hold on to the boat for a while till some local fishermen rescued us. It was a horrifying experience."
"Fortunately, the entire unit is safe and we are back in Chennai. We will resume shooting for the film tomorrow in Pondicherry," he added.
Sneha, meanwhile, is still shaken. "She took her time to get back to normal and now she's doing fine. I also gave her the option of postponing the shoot for a while, but she insisted that we complete the schedule," he added.

Audio

The music was composed by Vijay Antony in his third collaboration with Kumaravelan. The music was launched by director Bala and received by actor Vikram on 26 November 2012. The film has three songs, apart from a theme song. Kumaravelan said, "There’s a song about cops in this film. Vijay Antony scored the music for the song in just two days. There is also an inspirational song sung by Shankar Mahadevan."

Release
The satellite rights of the film were sold to Zee Thamizh. The movie was released on 22 February 2013 along with Ameerin Aadhi Bhagavan to average collections and at number 5 in the Chennai box office. Over the coming weeks, the collection improved and it moved to number 4 at the box office. It completed 50 days run at limited centers in Chennai and at the end of the theatrical run, it did mediocre business.

Critical reception
The movie opened to extremely positive reviews. Sify rated the movie as "Haridas makes for absolutely compelling viewing. It tugs at your heartstrings, and urges you to introspect and makes you look at children with disability differently. Go for it!". Kollytalk rated the movie as "An adorable effort on celluloid. It has come as fresh air among load of mindless flicks that try in vain to entertain or engage us." Critics also appreciated the performance of the lead actors, Kishore, Sneha and Prithviraj. Galatta rated the movie as "Three cheers to Haridas team! A sensible film, which will be a sure winner at the boxoffice. Don't miss it."  Yahoo rated the movie as "Emotionally uplifting film and it is an effort that is sure to attract lot of attention from the masses." The Hindu rated the movie as "Story of action and emotions. Watch Haridas. He deserves to be supported." Behindwoods rated the movie as "Honorable tribute to parental love and sacrifice." Tikkview.com given 4.1/5 for haridas and their review says that "Touching tale.Highly recommended... Everything about this film is come out well, Direction, Screenplay, Actors etc.Story have the depth to touch audience heart."

Remakes
The film is going to be remade in Bhojpuri. The film is to be directed by Judo Ramu, son of ace stunt master Judo. K. K. Rathnam. Judo Ramu has directed several films in Bhojpuri, including the Rajinikanth-starrer Baadshah, and was so impressed with Haridas that he has decided to remake it.

Awards
1. Second Best Film - 11th Chennai International Film Festival
2. Special Jury Award For Individual Excellence to Prithviraj Das - 11th Chennai International Film Festival

References

External links
 

2013 films
Films about autism
Films about disability in India
2010s Tamil-language films
Films scored by Vijay Antony
Fictional portrayals of the Tamil Nadu Police
2010s police procedural films
Films set in Andhra Pradesh
Indian drama films
Tamil films remade in other languages
Indian nonlinear narrative films
Films about organised crime in India